672 Astarte is a minor planet orbiting the Sun.

References

External links
 
 

Background asteroids
Astarte
19080921
Astarte